Tripura Sundari is a 1978 Indian Tamil-language film directed by K. Chandra Bose. The film stars Srikanth, Prabha and Manju Bhargavi.

Cast 
Srikanth
Prabha
Manju Bhargavi

Soundtrack 
The music is scored by Ilaiyaraaja.

References

External links
 

1978 films
Films scored by Ilaiyaraaja
1970s Tamil-language films